Stormlord is an extreme metal (self-classified as "Extreme epic metal") band from Rome, Italy. They have released six full-length albums to date: Supreme Art of War (1999), At the Gates of Utopia (2001), The Gorgon Cult (2004), Mare Nostrum (2008), Hesperia (2013), and Far (2019). Their prominent use of keyboards compared to many other black metal bands gives their sound an epic feel, much like power metal.

Most of their songs have an epic theme, recurring to stories and characters from Greek Mythology (Zeus, Hades, Persephone, Prometheus, Medusa, Titans), and battles. Their vocalist, Cristiano can scream in two voices: the first one high pitched, which is relative to black metal and the second is more guttural and monstrous, which is relative to death metal and often used for choruses.

Members

Current members 
Cristiano Borchi - vocals (1991-present), bass (1991-1996)
Francesco Bucci - bass (1997-present)
David Folchitto - drums (1999-present)
Gianpaolo Caprino - guitars, clean vocals, keyboards (2002-present)
Andrea Angelini - guitars (2010-present)
Riccardo Studer - keyboards (2011-present)

Session/live members:
A. G. Volgar (Deviate Damaen) - opera vocals, narration (studio only)
Elisabetta Marchetti - female vocals (live/studio since 2004 with "The Gorgon Cult")

Past members 
Pierangelo Giglioni - guitars (1997–2010)
Claudio Di Carlo - guitars (1991–1994)
Riccardo Montanari - drums (1991–1994)
Andrea Cacciotti - guitars (1993–1995)
Dario Maurizi - guitars (1995)
Gabriele Valerio - drums (1995) (now in Theatres Des Vampires and Astarte Syriaca)
Fabrizio Cariani - keyboards (1995–1999)
Marcello Baragona - drums (1995–1999)
Dux Tenebrarum - guitars (1997)
Raffaella Grifoni - female vocals (1997)
Malfeitor Fabban (Aborym)- bass (1997-1998)
Simone Scazzocchio - keyboards
Luca Bellanova - keyboards (live only)
Maurizio Pariotti - keyboards (live only)

Timeline

Discography

Full lengths 
 Supreme Art of War (1999)
 At the Gates of Utopia (2001)
 The Gorgon Cult (2004)
 Mare Nostrum (2008)
 Hesperia (2013)
 Far (2019)

EPs 
 Under the Sign of the Sword (1997)
 Where My Spirit Forever Shall Be (1998)
 The Curse of Medusa (2001)

Demos 
 Demo 1992 (1992)
 Black Knight (1993)
 Promo 1997 (1997)

DVDs 
 The Battle of Quebec City: Live In Canada (2007)

Compilations 
 The Legacy of Medusa – 17 Years of Extreme Epic Metal (2008)

External links 
 Stormlord's website
 Stormlord's MySpace
 
 Drummer David Folchitto official website

Italian black metal musical groups
Musical groups established in 1991
Musical groups from Rome
1991 establishments in Italy
Locomotive Music artists
Scarlet Records artists